Abdulrahman Al-Safri (born 31 March 1993) is a Saudi Arabian professional footballer who plays as a midfielder for Al-Fayha.

Career
Al-Safri is a graduate of Al-Ahli's academy. Al-Safri joined Portuguese club Louletano, where he spent one season and made 3 appearances. Al-Safri then returned to Saudi Arabia and signed for Al-Ittihad. He once again spent a season at a club before moving on, this time joining Al-Watani. After 3 seasons at the club, Al-Safri left Al-Watani following their relegation to the Saudi Second Division and joined Jeddah. Al-Safri spent a season with Jeddah before joining newly-promoted Pro League side Damac. On 31 January 2020, Al-Safri was released by Damac. He made 9 league appearances for the club. Later on the same day, Al-Safri joined MS League side Al-Qadsiah. On 30 June 2021, Al-Safri joined Al-Fayha on a two-year contract.

Honours
Al-Fayha
King Cup: 2021–22

References

External links 
 

1993 births
Living people
Saudi Arabian footballers
Al-Ahli Saudi FC players
Louletano D.C. players
Ittihad FC players
Al-Watani Club players
Jeddah Club players
Damac FC players
Al-Qadsiah FC players
Al-Fayha FC players
Association football midfielders
Saudi Arabian expatriate footballers
Saudi Arabian expatriate sportspeople in Portugal
Expatriate footballers in Portugal
Saudi First Division League players
Saudi Professional League players